Sidlingu is a 2012 Indian Kannada-language coming of age film starring Yogesh and Ramya in the lead roles. The film has been directed and written by Vijaya Prasad, who makes his big screen debut after directing many TV series. The film is produced by Yogesh's father, T. P. Siddaraju of Duniya fame. Anoop Seelin has composed the music. Sugnan aka Gnana Murthy who has worked for movies like Mani, Lifeu Isthene, Premism, Manasology and many more is the director of cinematography.

The film was released on 13 January 2012.

Plot
Sidlingu has a passion for cars since his childhood and gets closer to a young girl and a middle-aged lecturer because of his desire to own a car. But the lecturer, who gives him lift, seduces him. Later Sidlingu moves to Srirangapatna where he finds one vintage car and wants to purchase it. There he meets schoolteacher Mangala who helps him to realise his dreams.
Sidlingu even expresses his desire to marry Mangala, but she keeps mum as she feels Sidlingu is an innocent and infatuated youngster. Later tragedy strikes and robs Sidlingu off Mangala.

Production
Actress Ramya is noted for an image makeover in this film playing the role of Mangala, a middle-class school teacher portraying the role of a woman who is behind the success of a man in the film.

Cast
 Yogesh  as Sidlingu
 Ramya as Mangala
 Suman Ranganathan  as Aandalamma
 K. S. Sridhar as Asadullah Baig
 Girija Lokesh as Rangamma
 Achyuth Kumar as Appaji Gowda
 Chaswa as Jamaal alias biryani 
 Mimicry Dayanand
 Amarnath Aaradhya
 Mimicry Gopi
 Srikanth Heblikar
 HMT Vijay
 Nagaraj Gowda
 Vatsala Mohan
 Kaddipudi Chandru
 Shankar Rao
 Kempegowda

Reception

Critical response 

A critic from The New Indian Express wrote "Anup Silin has provided lilting music. It is certainly worth watching till  intermission. One needs a little bit extra patience to sit through its second half". A critic from News18 India wrote "The rural situations look natural and real thanks to the work done by art director. 'Sidlingu' is a better presented with a good performance from young hero Yogish". Shruti I L from DNA wrote "Anoop Seelin’s music, especially in the song Ellelo oduva manase… is worth a mention. Sidlingu held all the possibilities of soaring high but it falls short, leaving you asking for more". A critic from Bangalore Mirror wrote  "What could have been another film in the genre of Mera Naam Joker and My Autograph ends up being pathetically ordinary. But for the twist in the last 10 seconds, the audience would have felt cheated by the trailers".

Soundtrack

The much-hyped audio of ‘Sidlingu’ was released on 29 November 2011 at Srinivasa Theatre, Gowdana Palya which was attended by Kannada film personalities such as Raghavendra Rajkumar, Prajwal Devaraj, Diganth, Jaggesh and Duniya Vijay.

Awards

References

External links
 

Films scored by Anoop Seelin
2012 romantic drama films
2012 films
Indian coming-of-age drama films
2010s Kannada-language films
2012 drama films
Indian romantic drama films
2010s coming-of-age drama films
Films directed by Vijaya Prasad